The One or West Wapei languages constitute a branch of the Torricelli language family. They are spoken in north-central Sandaun Province, Papua New Guinea.

Languages
Foley (2018) lists:

 One, Seta, Seti

Vocabulary comparison
The following basic vocabulary words are from the Trans-New Guinea database, citing data from Laycock (1968) and SIL (2000):

{| class="wikitable sortable"
! gloss !! One, Inebu !! Seta !! Seti
|-
! head
| selə || sela; sila || səkon
|-
! hair
|  || sila batalayo || 
|-
! ear
| tipi || tɩbɩli; təpəli || arpan
|-
! eye
| namla || namana; naməna || nəŋka
|-
! nose
| suwla || sulu; sülü || sünü
|-
! tooth
| nala || nɛla; nelə || neːn
|-
! tongue
| alfoi || ngctela; ŋkotelə || ŋkoten
|-
! leg
| teu || teu || saten
|-
! louse
| munola || təmofəl || təmpofənə
|-
! dog
| paːla || balə; paːlə || paːn
|-
! bird
| nawra || pəsiapa; pɩsapə || pəlisia
|-
! egg
| amu || aːmo; gambu || tənna
|-
! blood
| fampwi || soli || soro
|-
! bone
| amla || kamóya || komoyo
|-
! skin
| plapi || tapeo; tapio || naːni
|-
! breast
| nimla || mommo; momo || momo
|-
! tree
| silo || si || səno
|-
! man
| mana || manə; oma || maŋko
|-
! woman
| piːni || bɩni; pin || pəneno
|-
! sky
|  || yebiti || 
|-
! sun
| ayre || kebɩli; kepli || koːfəni
|-
! moon
| anini || anine; funmo || yinmon
|-
! water
| faːla || mi || miː
|-
! fire
| niːpi || sakul; sakulu || nep
|-
! stone
| taːma || kuləbol; tumala || toːmu
|-
! road, path
|  || plɛn || 
|-
! eat
|  || wune woyuye || 
|-
! two
| plale || pəla || pəna
|}

References

 

 
Torricelli Range languages
Languages of Sandaun Province